Majhapaper.com is a Marathi online news and article publishing website. It caters to the wide Marathi speaking population of 30,000,000 all over the world. Owned by Hrimon Media Pvt Ltd, Pune, Majhapaper is the first digital publication which is exclusively published in Marathi. Along with a headquarter in Pune, Majhapaper has offices in Solapur and Jalgaon. The Majhapaper website currently has more than 50,000 news articles with special focus on categories such as Youth, Health, Agriculture, Career etc.

Technology 
Majhapaper.com is the best website in terms of technical capabilities in the media segment. It is the only website to have 100/100 Google page speed score, a benchmark to check how optimized and user friendly a website can be. Majhapaper.com is currently only news website in the world to implement HTTP/2 protocol, the next generation protocol which provides security without affecting the performance.

Newspapers published in India